Arthur B. Ripley Desert Woodland State Park is a state park in the western Antelope Valley in Southern California. The park protects mature stands of Joshua trees (Yucca brevifolia) and California juniper trees (Juniperus californica) in their western Mojave Desert habitat.

History
The site was donated to the state in 1988 by farmer Arthur "Archie" Ripley, and preserves a remnant of Joshua/juniper woodland which once grew in great abundance throughout the valley. Today only remnant parcels of this woodland community remain in the valley, much of the rest having been cleared for farming, housing, and some rather esoteric uses — directions for nighttime automobile travelers in the first half of the 20th century and even pulp for newspaper usage.  The  property was officially acquired in 1993.

The Joshua tree played an important part in the cultural history of the Antelope Valley, providing a vital source of food and fiber materials for the Native Americans that inhabited the region.

The Junipers in the park were the subject of botanical research by the late Otis M. (Milt) Stark, a Lancaster wildflower photographer and local historian who was among the volunteers who helped establish trails through the park.

See also
List of California state parks
Natural history of the Mojave Desert
Protected areas of the Mojave Desert

References

External links
 California State Parks: official Arthur B. Ripley Desert Woodland State Park website
 https://obittree.com/obituary/us/california/lancaster/halley-olsen-murphy-funerals-and-cremations/milt-stark/2773684/

State parks of California
Antelope Valley
Nature reserves in California
Parks in Los Angeles County, California
Protected areas of the Mojave Desert
Protected areas established in 1993
1993 establishments in California